Thomas Drury may refer to:

 Thomas Drury (1551–1603), one of a group of men believed to be involved in reporting the playwright Christopher Marlowe for blasphemy
 Thomas Drury (1668) (1668–1723), colonial legislator from Framingham, Massachusetts
 Sir Thomas Drury, 1st Baronet (1712–1759), MP Maldon 1741
 Thomas Joseph Drury (1908–1992), Roman Catholic bishop of San Angelo and of Corpus Christi
 Thomas Drury (bishop) (1847–1926), Anglican bishop and Master of St Catharine's College, Cambridge